Deh Pain or Deh-e Pain may refer to:
 Deh-e Pain, Estahban, Fars Province
 Deh-e Pain, Lamerd, Fars Province
 Deh-e Pain, Shahr-e Babak, Kerman Province
 Deh-e Pain, Kohgiluyeh and Boyer-Ahmad
 Deh Pain, Razavi Khorasan
 Deh-e Pain, Razavi Khorasan
 Deh Pain Rural District, in Ilam Province